Tronstad is a small village south of Sylling in Lier municipality, Norway.

It is also a surname. It may refer to:

Bjørn Tronstad (born 1957), Norwegian footballer
Elsbeth Tronstad (born 1956), Norwegian businessperson and politician 
Leif Tronstad (1903–1945), Norwegian scientist, intelligence officer and military organizer
Sondre Tronstad (born 1995), Norwegian footballer